Claude Williams (born November 25, 1955, in Saint-Antoine, New Brunswick) is a politician and former civil servant in the province of New Brunswick, Canada.

Williams studied at the University of Moncton, graduating with a Bachelor of Business Administration degree. Williams was executive assistant to Omer Léger and then a regional manager for the provincial Department of Fisheries and Aquaculture. He also served as a municipal councillor in Saint-Antoine.

He was first elected to the Legislative Assembly of New Brunswick in a 2001 by-election and was re-elected in the 2003 general election and the 2006 general election.  He served in the cabinet for part of 2006. He was Minister of Transportation and Infrastructure from 2010 until his defeat in the 2014 general election.

References 
 MLA Bios, Government of New Brunswick

1955 births
Living people
Université de Moncton alumni
Progressive Conservative Party of New Brunswick MLAs
Members of the Executive Council of New Brunswick
Acadian people
People from Kent County, New Brunswick
New Brunswick municipal councillors
21st-century Canadian politicians